SS Stanley was an iron sailing steam ship built by Pile, Spence & Co. in West Hartlepool in 1859.  It was wrecked on the Black Middens during a gale on 24 November 1864.

References

Further reading
 

Victorian-era passenger ships of the United Kingdom
Steamships of the United Kingdom
Ships built on the River Tees
1859 ships